The Oceania Rugby Men's Sevens Championship is an international rugby sevens competition organised by Oceania Rugby. It has been held regularly since 2008 to select the best men's national team in Oceania.

Participating teams
Men's teams competing in the Oceania Sevens and their finishing positions are as follows (placings of home nations in bold):

 Notes:
 * – an asterisk indicates a shared placing (e.g. 3* is equal third)

Summary of tournaments

Results by year
The table below is a summary of the men's finals matches at the Oceania Sevens since 2008:

Results by team
Updated after the 2022 edition:

Notes:
 Invited team, not a member of Oceania Rugby.

See also 
 Oceania Women's Sevens Championship

References

External links 
 

 
Rugby union competitions in Oceania for national teams
Rugby sevens competitions in Oceania
Recurring sporting events established in 2008